Danielle Nicole Jones ( Brown; born August 12, 1986), also known as Mama Doctor Jones, is an American obstetrician-gynecologist (OB/GYN) and science communicator. Various media outlets have highlighted her significant following on YouTube, Instagram, and TikTok, where she has received attention for her posts aiming to educate young people about sexual health.

Personal life and education 
Jones was born in Borger, Texas on August 12, 1986. 

She received a Bachelors of Science in Psychology from Texas A&M University before pursuing postgraduate medical studies at the Texas Tech University Health Sciences Center, where she received her Doctorate of Medicine.

Jones is married to Donnie Ray Jones, a coder and photographer, with whom she has four children. In 2021, the family moved to Invercargill, New Zealand.

Career
She worked as an OB/GYN at Baylor Scott & White Medical Center in College Station, Texas and as an assistant professor at Texas A&M Health Science Center. Various media outlets have highlighted her significant following on YouTube, Instagram, and TikTok, where she has received attention for her posts aiming to educate young people about sexual health.

Jones is a founding member of the Pinnacle Conference, a leadership conference for female physicians, as well as the Association for Healthcare Social Media.

In 2021, she accepted a job at Southland Hospital in Invercargill, New Zealand.

Social media 
In 2009, Jones began posting on social media about medical topics as a medical student with two goals: provide the public with accurate medical information and provide a "traveling CV" of her work. Her primary modes of communication were Twitter and her blog.

During her medical residency, Jones stopped uploading information to social media because she was a new mom and "was so busy and learning to be a doctor and focusing every ounce of [her] energy on being a good doctor and learning everything [she] could." 

Four years later, Jones rejoined social media, focusing her energy on Instagram, then moved to YouTube. 

In November 2021, Jones received a YouTube gold award for reaching one million subscribers.

Recognition

References

External links

1986 births
Living people
American obstetricians
American gynecologists
Women gynaecologists
21st-century American women physicians
21st-century American physicians
People from Borger, Texas
Health and fitness YouTubers
American YouTubers
American TikTokers
Texas A&M University alumni
Texas Tech University Health Sciences Center alumni
Celebrity doctors
Educational and science YouTubers
Educators from Texas
American women educators
Texas A&M University faculty